Laura Vickerson (born 1959 in Edmonton, Alberta) is a Canadian artist who works with mixed media in site-specific situations. She often includes discarded household items in her projects as a comment on changing trends, consumerism and human relationships with everyday objects. Vickerson was a professor in Craft and Emerging Media at the Alberta College of Art and Design, where she taught starting in 1989. Vikerson retired in 2020 and is now a Professor Emeritus.

Exhibitions

Vickerson has exhibited at the Biennale du Lin in Quebec, the 5th Istanbul Biennial, Textile Museum of Canada, Surrey Art Gallery, the Southern Alberta Art Gallery and the Oakville Galleries.

Works
In 2018 she was part of the exhibition entitled Fabrications at the Kelowna Art Gallery, along with three fellow women installation artists from different regions of Canada -- Libby Hague, Gisele Amantea, and Yael Brotman. Her piece, entitled Air, invites guests to lie barefoot below a canopy of cream-coloured translucent pieces of used clothing that she sewed together and suspended nearly 10 feet above the floor.

Fairy Tales and Factories was a site specific work created by Laura Vickerson for Locus+ in Newcastle upon Tyne, England and exhibited March 26-April 9, 1999. It was her first show in the UK. The installation consisted of a cape, 4 metres wide and 21 metres long, created from hundreds of thousands of rose petals pinned to organza. The garment was made on-site at Farfield Mill, which closed after 169 years of linen production, in collaboration with a local women's group, the Sedbergh Stitchers. Conversations with them and people connected to the building were recorded and played during the show.

References

Canadian installation artists
Artists from Edmonton
Living people
1959 births
20th-century Canadian women artists
21st-century Canadian women artists